Barry Horne (born 21 November 1977) is a British racing driver currently competing in the British Touring Car Championship. He made his debut in 2015.

Racing career
Horne began his career in the 1998 British Formula Ford Championship, he raced in the championship from 1998–1999 ending 8th in the standings in 1998. He switched to the Porsche Carrera Cup GB for the 2003 season, he won the championship that year, with 333 points. From 2003–2004 Horne also raced in the Porsche Supercup. In August 2015, it was announced that Horne would make his British Touring Car Championship debut with Dextra Racing driving a Ford Focus ST, replacing Alex Martin at Snetterton.

Racing record

Complete British Touring Car Championship results
(key) (Races in bold indicate pole position – 1 point awarded just in first race; races in italics indicate fastest lap – 1 point awarded all races; * signifies that driver led race for at least one lap – 1 point given all races)

References

External links
 

1977 births
Living people
British Touring Car Championship drivers
British GT Championship drivers
Scottish racing drivers
British racing drivers
Porsche Carrera Cup GB drivers
Nürburgring 24 Hours drivers